The Petroglyph Museum is a museum in Gobustan, Azerbaijan.

Design and construction
The construction of museum was financed by Azerbaijani Ministry of Culture in 2010. The museum was designed and constructed by Latvian "El Studio" Ltd. The museum was opened on 26 December 2011 by Ilham Aliyev.

Building
The museum's exhibition hall consists of various sections. The section "Gobustan: UNESCO World Cultural Heritage" provides information about 200 similar monuments around the world.

The museum has a 3D cinema hall for 45 seats. It is equipped with 7 sound amplifiers, monitors and projectors.

Collections
The museum’s permanent exhibition includes 12 rooms which displays and highlights the significance of the history of Gobustan petroglyphs.

Awards
The museum received a special European Museum Forum award in 2013.

See also
 Yanar Dag
 Fire Temple of Baku
 Maiden Tower

References

External links

The Petroglyph Museum at Gobustan in Azerbaijan (Video)

Gobustan, Baku
History museums in Azerbaijan
Archaeological museums in Azerbaijan
Museums established in 2011
2011 establishments in Azerbaijan